Forever Friends is a 1996 Hong Kong released Taiwanese   war-comedy film directed by Kevin Chu, starring Taiwan's popular "four little heavenly kings" (Nicky Wu, Alec Su, Takeshi Kaneshiro and Jimmy Lin). The original Taiwanese version of the film in Mandarin Chinese language was released in 1995 under the title "號角響起"  (pinyin: Hao jiao xiang qi) which literally translate to "sounded horns". With the raising popularity of the "four little heavenly kings" in Hong Kong, the film was dubbed in Cantonese and renamed to a more comical title which literally translate to "four not normal youngsters" in order to cater more to the Hong Kong audiences.

Synopsis 
In the mid 1990s with rumor of Mainland China declaring war on Taiwan, both sides tense up afraid of war breaking out. Taiwan in order to show their military power against Mainland gives all of their troops a strict intense war training in order to prepare for war.

Captain Li Wei-Han (Nicky Wu) is the newly appointed captain of a "Special Squad" unit which consist of misfits and rejects from other army units. He is young for his ranking which leads to others mistaking him as a private at first. He has high expectations for his unit and tells him he will lead them to succeed. On the first official day of training he is embarrassed by his unit in front of his superiors when his unit doesn't even arrive at the finish point of training but all of them falls asleep in the middle of the training field instead. This leads to him being strict and stern with them which makes his while unit hate him, but at the end his entire squad realize his a caring leader that has always looked out for them.

Private Luo Zhi-Jiang (Alec Su), whose specialty is only studying and retaking college entrance exams is a clumsy clots. He has taken his college exam three times without passing, without being able to attend any universities he is forced to serve his army term.  Previously the army DJ in his former unit, he accidentally played the wrong song on the loud speaker and was told to pack his belongings and sent to "Special Squad" unit. He is weak and cowardly which makes it hard for him to complete most of his training tasks. Every night he writes in a journal of the hardship he has endured while serving in the army and counting the days until his mandatory army term is over.

Private Li Ta-Wei (Takeshi Kaneshiro), is a former triad member with a huge tattoo on his left shoulder, because of his past and physical appearance he is stereotype with triad comments from the captain. He previously servered a two-year prison sentence for gang fighting and killing someone, and regrets his triad past because his triad boss never once visited him while he in jail. He thinks due to his triad past no one will ever want to become close to him and that he will never be respected as a human being. He has a hot temper and often gets into fights with troops from other units.

Private Zeng Zhi-Xiang (Jimmy Lin), is a self-appointed fortune teller master and wizard who can put a curse on someone. A master at courting girls, he has two wives back at home. He was transferred to the "Special Squad" unit because while trying to get on the good side of his previous captain he gave his captain a few lucky numbers to gamble with which didn't work and caused his previous captain to lose a big sum of money. His previous captain put him through intense training as punishment for giving him phony lucky numbers, while yelling at Zhi-Xiang, the captain suffered an epilepsy seizure. No one believed the captain had an epilepsy seizure and claimed that Zhi-Xiang had put an hex on the captain for punishing him.

Due to Zhi-Jiang clumsiness during training, captain Li is constantly given a stern scolding of his inadequate to properly train an army unit. Soon the "Special Squad" is label as the "Cheerleading Squad" of the army by captain Li's superiors and constantly made fun of by the other army squads. During a visit by the army colonel,  Zhi-Jiang is asked by the corporal on his daily life as an army soldier. He tells the colonel frankly about how he feels and is punished by the major for not knowing how to speak deferentially, while the a soldier from another squad tells the colonel about how much he is enjoying army life. The delighted colonel than offered to extend the soldier's military service.  Not wanting to serve an extended army term the private admits to lying to the colonel. The colonel is furious and tells the entire regiment's officers that they should be truthful in their words.

During a mock war training exercise privates Luo, Li, Zeng and Wei are assigned to distribute water and retrieve water for the troops on their team that is participating in the mock war. While driving around the training grounds they encounter the rival army team, not wanting to be captured they fight till their deaths until the captain for the rival team tells his troops to move on as they don't want to waste time dealing with four lowly privates on the other team. The four use the opportunity of not being captured to go into civilian town and visit Zhi-Xiang's wives and Ta-Wei's mother. On their way back to the army base they encounter all the superiors from the rival team at a breakfast stand, since the superiors from the rival team were in the middle of eating and not prepared for combat the four ends up capturing all the higher superiors from the rival units and ends up winning the mock war for their squad teams.

Cast 
Nicky Wu as Captain Li Wei-Han
Alec Su as Private Luo Zhi-Jiang
Takeshi Kaneshiro as Private Li Ta-Wei
Jimmy Lin as Private Zeng Zhi-Xiang
Wu Ming as Ta-Wei mother
Cheung Laap-Wai as Private Wei Yu-nan 
Wang De-Zhi as Army Sergeant
Cheung Ching-Yung as Private Li Wei Hon

Facts 

The film was commissioned by the Republic of China Army to serve as a training guide in army life since Taiwan has an mandatory compulsory military service.
Jimmy Lin was the more popular of the "four little heavenly kings" and had an established fan base in Hong Kong in the mid 1990s. After the filming of the film Lin was required to serve his compulsory military service which saw his popularity in both Taiwan and Hong Kong diminish when the film was released in Hong Kong. 
After the finish of filming, Nicky Wu and Alec Su from the popular Taiwanese boyband Xiao Hu Dui officially disbanded and embarked on solo careers. 
The film was released in Japan with Takeshi Kaneshiro billed as the main star due to his growing popularity in the country.

Production credits 
Production Manager: Lee Ging-Suen, Chan Gei-Yuen
Assistant Director: Chung Bing-Wong, Chui Gwok-Yin
Art Director: Lu Chun
Script Supervisor: Kelly Mang Cheung-Lee
Lighting: Choi Sam-Kat
Costume Designer: Lok Sai-Gwong
Makeup: Yau Yee-Chu
Props: Lam Sing-Kwok
Presenter: Ng Dui

References

External links 
 

1996 films
1990s war comedy films
Films directed by Kevin Chu
1990s Mandarin-language films
Taiwanese war comedy films
1996 comedy films